Caipirinha is Brazil's national cocktail, made with cachaça (sugarcane hard liquor), sugar, and lime. The drink is prepared by mixing the fruit and the sugar together, then adding the liquor. This can be made in a single large glass to be shared among people, or in a larger jar, from which it is served in individual glasses.

History

Although the origin of the drink is unknown, one account says it came about around 1918 in the region of  Alentejo in Portugal, with a popular recipe made with lemon, garlic, and honey, indicated for patients with the Spanish flu. Another account is that Caipirinha is based on Poncha, an alcoholic drink from Madeira, Portugal. The main ingredient is aguardente de cana, which is made from sugar cane. Sugar cane production was switched from Madeira to Brazil by the Portuguese as they needed more land to plant it on. Before this people in Madeira had already created aguardente de cana, which was the ancestor to cachaça.

Today, it is still used as a tonic for the common cold. Commonly, practitioners add some distilled spirits to home remedies to expedite the therapeutic effect. Aguardente was commonly used. "Until one day, someone decided to remove the garlic and honey. Then added a few tablespoons of sugar to reduce the acidity of the lime. The ice came next, to ward off the heat," explains Carlos Lima, executive director of IBRAC (Brazilian Institute of Cachaça).

According to historians, the caipirinha was invented by landowning farmers in the region of Piracicaba, the interior of the State of São Paulo during the 19th century as a local drink for 'high standard' events and parties (parties at Barão de Serra Negra palace), a reflection of the strong sugarcane culture in the region.
Original recipe use a kind of Lemon called "galeguinho", a small yellow/green lemon very common in São Paulo countryside houses backyards. Currently it is made with a bigger green lemon called Tahiti lemon, a specie of lemon more spread around the country markets.    
    
The caipirinha is the strongest national cocktail of Brazil, and is imbibed in restaurants, bars, and many households throughout the country. Once almost unknown outside Brazil, the drink became more popular and more widely available in recent years, in large part due to the rising availability of first-rate brands of cachaça outside Brazil. The International Bartenders Association designated it as one of its Official Cocktails, as a Contemporary Classic.

Name
The word caipirinha is the diminutive of the word caipira, which in Brazilian Portuguese refers to someone from the countryside (specifically, someone from the rural parts of south-central Brazil), similar to US English hillbilly or the Lowland Scots teuchter.  Except caipira refers to indigenous rather than colonizer.   Caipira is a two-gender noun. The diminutive mostly refers to the drink, in which case it is a feminine noun.

Variations
Although Brazilian law (Decree 6.871 based on Normative Ruling 55, from Oct. 31, 2008) as well as the International Bartenders Association (IBA) allow the use of the name caipirinha for the version with lime only, the term is often used to describe any cachaça-and-fruit-juice drink with the fruit's name (e.g., a passionfruit caipirinha, kiwifruit caipirinha or strawberry caipirinha).
Caipifruta is a very popular caipirinha drink in Brazil, consisting of cachaça, crushed fresh fruits (either singly or in combination), and crushed ice.  The most popular fresh fruits used to create caipifrutas are tangerine, lime, kiwifruit, passion fruit, pineapple, lemon, grapes, mango, cajá (Spondias mombin fruit), and caju (cashew fruit).

Derivations
There are many derivations of caipirinha in which other spirits are substituted for cachaça. Some include:

 Caipiroska is the usual alternative, made with vodka
 Sakerinha is a variant made with sake
 Caipinheger is another variation made using Steinhäger.
 Caipirão is another Portuguese variation made using Licor Beirão instead of cachaça; the liquor is very sweet, so no sugar is used.
 A variation from Italy is made using Campari instead of cachaça.
 Caipirissima is the  alternative made with rum.

See also

 Cocktails with cachaça
 List of cocktails with cachaça
 Ti' Punch – similar French Caribbean cocktail, made with rhum agricole, a fermented sugar cane juice similar to Cachaça
 Daiquiri – similar Cuban cocktail, made with rum
 Grog – similar British cocktail, made with rum
 List of Brazilian dishes
 List of Brazilian drinks
 Mojito
 Sour (cocktail)

References

External links
 
 

Brazilian alcoholic drinks
Cocktails with rum
Cold drinks
Limes (fruit)
Portuguese words and phrases
Citrus cocktails
Cocktails with cachaça
Three-ingredient cocktails
Sour cocktails
Mixed drinks